Still (also known as Stillusion) is the first, and to date only, solo album, released in 1973 by Pete Sinfield, former lyricist of progressive rock band King Crimson. At the time, Sinfield was involved with Emerson, Lake & Palmer, and Greg Lake assisted with vocals, while other King Crimson alumni provided assistance. The cover artwork depicts "The Big Friend" by German artist Sulamith Wülfing.

Track listing

1993 CD re-issue includes alternates mixes of the songs, as well as two extra tracks: "Hanging Fire" and "Can You Forgive a Fool?"

Personnel
Peter Sinfield - vocals, twelve-string guitar, synthesizer, production, cover design
Greg Lake - vocals, electric guitar, associate producer, mixing
W.G. Snuffy Walden - electric guitar
Keith Christmas - guitar
Richard Brunton - guitar
B.J. Cole - steel guitar
Boz Burrell - bass guitar
John Wetton - bass guitar
Steve Dolan - bass guitar
Keith Tippett - piano on "The Song of the Sea Goat"
Tim Hinkley - piano, electric piano
Brian Flowers - synthesizer
Phil Jump - glockenspiel, keyboards, Hammond organ, electric piano, piano, organ, synthesizer
Mel Collins - alto flute, bass flute, alto saxophone, tenor saxophone, baritone saxophone, celeste, arranger, associate producer, mixing
Don Honeywell - baritone saxophone on "The Night People"
Robin Miller - English horn
Greg Bowen - trumpet
Stan Roderick - trumpet
Chris Pyne - trombone
Ian Wallace - drums, snare drum
Alan "Min" Mennie - drums, percussion

Technical
Mel Collins - associate producer, mixing assistant
Greg Lake - associate producer for vocals, mixing
Andy Hendriksen, Phil Lever, Ray Hendriksen, Peter Gallen - engineer

References

1973 debut albums
Peter Sinfield albums
Manticore Records albums
Albums produced by Peter Sinfield